Mark Brazill is a television creator from Dunkirk, NY. He is best known as one of the creators of That '70s Show.

Conflict with Judd Apatow
In late 2001, Judd Apatow sought to have Topher Grace of That '70s Show appear in an episode of his series Undeclared. This initiated a string of heated emails between the two. Brazill claimed that Apatow had stolen his idea for a comedy about a rock band and used it on The Ben Stiller Show in the early 1990s. The sketch was titled "The Grungies", a dark parody of The Monkees television series focusing on an outrageous grunge band. The emails were subsequently leaked and widely circulated online.

References

External links
 

Living people
American television producers
Year of birth missing (living people)